Christ School is a private college preparatory boarding and day school for boys in Arden, North Carolina, a suburb of Asheville, in the Blue Ridge Mountains. While affiliated with the Episcopal Church, it is open to students of all faiths and backgrounds.

History 

Christ School was founded in 1900 by Thomas and Susan Wetmore.

The  campus is home to approximately 290 boys grades 8-12. Students come from 19 different states and 7 different countries.

Christ School is affiliated with the Episcopal Church but receives no funding or direction from it. The community gathers for chapel services three times per week. St Joseph's Chapel is the longest continuously operating Episcopal church in western North Carolina.

Academics 

There are 24 Honors classes and 20 Advanced Placement class offered. More than 70% of the faculty live on campus.

In addition to on-campus learning, there are an average of five international trips each school year.

Art 

Christ School students have won Gold Keys  at the Scholastic Art & Writing Awards, part of the Alliance for Young Artists & Writers as well as Scholastic Art Awards National American Visions Medal.

Traditions 

Christ School has traditions that date back to the earliest days of the school. Those range from seniors wearing green blazers to traditions around "Yard A" and more.

Christ School has a historic rivalry with Asheville School. "The Game" is the oldest prep school football rivalry in both North and South Carolina, dating back to 1911. The Fayssoux-Arbogast Trophy was created in 1971 and was named after Richard Fayssoux, football coach at Christ School from 1920 to 1966 and B.H. Arbogast, Asheville School coach from 1930-1967. Each year the football teams compete for the Fayssoux-Arbogast Trophy, which then remains with the winning school until the next year's game.

Athletics and extracurricular activities 

At Christ School all students are required to participate in sports. There are eleven varsity sports that students can participate in at school: three in the fall (football, soccer, and cross-country), three in the winter (basketball, swimming and wrestling), and five in the spring (track, tennis, golf, lacrosse, and baseball.)  The outdoor program, theater, and a number of other programs are offered year-round as sports as well.

There are 28 student-led clubs. Students produce a literary magazine called The Struan and a yearbook called The Angelus. The school also produces a biannual magazine called The Galax.

Basketball 

The Christ School basketball program has won six NCISAA State Championships (In North Carolina, public and private schools compete in different state associations). The last state title was in 2011. It is the only boys program in the history of Western North Carolina to win five straight state titles in basketball. Since 2005, the Greenies have sent 23 graduates to Division I programs. The Christ School basketball team plays its home games in the Mebane Fieldhouse. Christ School has had 2 McDonald All-Americans and Plumlee brothers Miles (Class 2008) and Mason (Class 2009) were drafted in the first round by the NBA. Mason won a gold medal in the FIBA World Championships in 2014. Each of the three Plumlee brothers attended Duke, and each left with a National Championship.

Football 

The football team reached the NCISAA Division II semi-final round for the 3rd straight year in 2014. The Greenies were state championship runners-up in 2015 and 2016. Since 2005, Christ School has had 10 players go on to play college football. The football team won the NCISAA Division II State Championship in 2020.

Golf 

The golf program has won NCISAA 3A State Championships in 2010, 2012 and 2014.

Lacrosse 

Christ School began a competitive lacrosse program in 2002. Since that time, the program has won ten conference championships and appeared in fourteen consecutive NCISAA playoffs, including State Championship wins in 2017, 2018, and 2019. There have been more than 23 all state selections and four high school All American selections.

Outdoor Program 

The Outdoor Program offers mountain biking, kayaking, rock climbing, hiking, fly fishing, adventure racing, and skiing.

Ski and snowboard 

Beginning in 2009, Christ School formed a Snow Team that practices at Cataloochee and competes regularly in the Cataloochee Interscholastic School Race League. In the 2012 Racing Season, two Snowboard team members, and two Ski team members attended the 2012 Nastar National Championships. The team members placed with two bronze, one silver, and one gold medal finishes.

Theater 

Theater productions include One Flew Over the Cuckoo's Nest, The Fantasticks, the operetta, The Pirates of Penzance, A Funny Thing Happened on the Way to the Forum, Little Shop of Horrors, and Shakespeare in Hollywood. The plays have done well in regional play competitions, such as the Independent School Theater Festival.

Notable alumni
John Shorter Stevens, politician and lawyer
 Charles Wright, winner of the Pulitzer Prize, National Book Award, and Poet Laureate of the United States

Athletes
 Corban Collins, professional basketball player
 Rob Gray, professional basketball player
 Chavis Holmes, professional basketball player
 Travis Holmes, professional basketball player
 Lakeem Jackson, professional basketball player
 Mason Plumlee, NBA player
 Miles Plumlee, NBA player
 Marshall Plumlee, NBA player
 Champ Stuart, baseball player

References

External links 
 The Association of Boarding Schools' profile
 Boarding School Review

Schools in Buncombe County, North Carolina
Educational institutions established in 1900
Episcopal schools in the United States
Boarding schools in North Carolina
Private high schools in North Carolina
1900 establishments in North Carolina